Thanh James Le (born August 28, 1985) is an American mixed martial artist, currently competes in the Featherweight division for the ONE Championship, he is a former ONE Featherweight World Champion. He has competed in Legacy Fighting Alliance. He also appeared on reality television series The Ultimate Fighter: Team McGregor vs. Team Faber. 

As of August 31, 2022, he is ranked #1 in the ONE Featherweight rankings.

Background
Le was born on August 28, 1985 in Owensboro, Kentucky, United States. His father migrated from Vietnam and met his mother in Kentucky, before the family moved to New Orleans, Louisiana when he was 5 year age.

Mixed martial arts career

Early career
Le made his professional MMA debut in November 2013. Over the next, he fought in his native United States and earned a record of 4 wins against 1 losses with all of his wins coming via stoppages.

The Ultimate Fighter
On August 31, 2015, it was announced that Hall would be a contestant on the 22nd season of The Ultimate Fighter reality show, representing Team Faber.

In the opening elimination bout, Le faced fellow American Andrés Quintana. He won the fight via knockout in the first round. 

Le represented Team Faber in the first preliminary fight of the season facing Sweden's Martin Svensson. He lost the fight via rear-naked choke submission in the second round.

Dana White's Tuesday Night Contender Series
Le appeared in Dana White's Contender Series 2 on July 18, 2017 against Lazar Stojadinovic. He won the fight via knockout in the second round, he wasn't given a UFC contract.

Legacy Fighting Alliance
Le his promotional debut against Alex Black on February 10, 2017 at LFA 3. He won the fight via TKO in the first round.

Le faced Bobby Moffett for the Interim LFA Featherweight Championship on January 19, 2018 at LFA 31. He won the fight via TKO in the second round to earn the title.

Le fought in a unification bout for the LFA Featherweight Championship against Kevin Aguilar on May 25, 2018 at LFA 40. He lost the fight via knockout in the first round.

ONE Championship
Le made his promotional debut against Yusup Saadulaev on May 3, 2019 at ONE: For Honor. He won the bout via knockout in the second round.

Le faced former ONE Lightweight World Champion Kotetsu Boku on August 16, 2019 at ONE: Dreams of Gold. He won the bout via knockout in the first round.

Le faced Ryogo Takahashi on January 10, 2020 at ONE: A New Tomorrow. He won the bout via knockout in the first round.

ONE Featherweight World Champion
Le faced Martin Nguyen for the ONE Featherweight World Championship on October 30, 2020 at ONE: Inside the Matrix. He won the fight via TKO in the third round.

Le was scheduled to defend his title against Garry Tonon on December 5, 2021 at ONE: X. However, on October 28, 2021, the event was postponed to early 2022 due to COVID-19 pandemic. The fight was rescheduled for ONE: Lights Out on March 11, 2022. He won the fight via knockout in the first round. This win earned him the Performance of the Night award.

Le faced Tang Kai on August 26, 2022 at ONE 160. He lost the fight and the title via unanimous decision.

Championships and accomplishments

Mixed martial arts
ONE Championship
ONE Featherweight World Championship (One time)
One successful title defense
Performance of the Night (One time) 
2020 ONE Championship Knockout of the Year 
2020 ONE Championship Fight of the Year 
Legacy Fighting Alliance
Interim LFA Featherweight Championship (One time)

Mixed martial arts record

|-
| Loss
| align=center| 13–3
| Tang Kai
| Decision (unanimous)
| ONE 160 
| 
| align=center| 5
| align=center| 5:00
| Kallang, Singapore
|  
|-
| Win
| align=center| 13–2
| Garry Tonon
| KO (punches)
| ONE: Lights Out 
| 
| align=center| 1
| align=center| 0:56
| Kallang, Singapore 
|  
|-
| Win
| align=center| 12–2
| Martin Nguyen 
| TKO (punches)
| ONE: Inside the Matrix
| 
| align=center| 3
| align=center| 2:19
| Kallang, Singapore
|  
|-
| Win
| align=center| 11–2
| Ryogo Takahashi 
| KO (punches)
| ONE: A New Tomorrow 
| 
| align=center| 1
| align=center| 2:51
| Bangkok, Thailand
|
|-
| Win
| align=center| 10–2
| Kotetsu Boku
| KO (body kick and punches)
| ONE: Dreams of Gold
| 
| align=center| 1
| align=center| 1:28
| Bangkok, Thailand
|
|-
| Win
| align=center| 9–2
| Yusup Saadulaev 
| KO (knee)
| ONE: For Honor 
| 
| align=center| 2
| align=center| 0:12
| Jakarta, Indonesia 
| 
|-
| Loss
| align=center| 8–2
| Kevin Aguilar
| KO (punches)
| LFA 40
| 
| align=center| 1
| align=center| 2:44
| Dallas, Texas, United States
| 
|-
| Win
| align=center| 8–1
| Bobby Moffett
| TKO (punches)
| LFA 31
| 
| align=center| 2
| align=center| 0:55
| Phoenix, Arizona, United States
| 
|-
| Win
| align=center| 7–1
| Lazar Stojadinovic
| KO (head kick and punches)
| Dana White's Contender Series 2 
| 
| align=center| 2
| align=center| 1:35
| Las Vegas, Nevada, United States
|
|-
| Win
| align=center| 6–1
| Alex Black
| TKO (body kick and punches)
| LFA 3
| 
| align=center| 1
| align=center| 1:43
| Lake Charles, Louisiana, United States 
| 
|-
| Win
| align=center| 5–1
| Cody James
| TKO (punches)
| MCFP 1 
| 
| align=center| 1
| align=center| 0:40
| Avondale, Louisiana, United States
|
|-
| Win
| align=center| 4–1
| Josh Quayhagen
| TKO (punches)
| World Fighting Championships 31 
| 
| align=center| 1
| align=center| 2:49
| Baton Rouge, Louisiana, United States
|
|-
| Win
| align=center| 3–1
| Shawn Fitzsimmons
| TKO (elbows)
| World Fighting Championships 27
| 
| align=center| 1
| align=center| 0:27
| Baton Rouge, Louisiana, United States
|
|-
| Win
| align=center| 2–1
| Matt Vaughn
| Submission
| Renaissance MMA 30 
| 
| align=center| 1
| align=center| 4:36
| New Orleans, Louisiana, United States
|
|-
| Win
| align=center| 1–1
| Justin Martin
| TKO (punches)
| XFC: Le vs. Martin
| 
| align=center| 1
| align=center| 2:44
| Ponchatoula, Louisiana, United States 
|
|-
| Loss
| align=center| 0–1
| Robert Dunn
| Submission (rear-naked choke)
| Renaissance MMA 29
| 
| align=center| 1
| align=center| 4:58
| New Orleans, Louisiana, United States 
| 

|-
|Loss
|align=center|1–1
| Martin Svensson
| Submission (rear-naked choke)
| rowspan=2|The Ultimate Fighter: Team McGregor vs. Team Faber
| (airdate)
|align=center|2
|align=center|3:48
| rowspan=2|Las Vegas, Nevada, United States
|
|-
|Win
|align=center|1–0
| Andrés Quintana
| KO (punch)
| (airdate)
|align=center|1
|align=center|2:27
|
|-

See also 
List of current ONE fighters
List of male mixed martial artists

References

External links
 Thanh Le at ONE

1985 births
Living people
American male mixed martial artists
Featherweight mixed martial artists
Lightweight mixed martial artists
Mixed martial artists utilizing taekwondo
Mixed martial artists utilizing Brazilian jiu-jitsu
American male taekwondo practitioners
American practitioners of Brazilian jiu-jitsu
People awarded a black belt in Brazilian jiu-jitsu
American sportspeople of Vietnamese descent
People from Owensboro, Kentucky
Sportspeople from Owensboro, Kentucky
ONE Championship champions